Human Resources Development Convention, 1975 is  an International Labour Organization Convention.

It was established in 1975:
Having decided upon the adoption of certain proposals with regard to human resources development: vocational guidance and vocational training, ...

Ratifications
As of 2022, the convention has been ratified by 68 states.

External links 
Text.
Ratifications.

International Labour Organization conventions
Treaties concluded in 1975
Treaties entered into force in 1977
Treaties of the Democratic Republic of Afghanistan
Treaties of Algeria
Treaties of Antigua and Barbuda
Treaties of Australia
Treaties of Argentina
Treaties of Austria
Treaties of Azerbaijan
Treaties of the Byelorussian Soviet Socialist Republic
Treaties of Bosnia and Herzegovina
Treaties of the military dictatorship in Brazil
Treaties of Burkina Faso
Treaties of the Central African Republic
Treaties of Cuba
Treaties of Cyprus
Treaties of Czechoslovakia
Treaties of the Czech Republic
Treaties of Denmark
Treaties of Ecuador
Treaties of Egypt
Treaties of El Salvador
Treaties of Fiji
Treaties of Finland
Treaties of France
Treaties of Georgia (country)
Treaties of West Germany
Treaties of Guinea
Treaties of Greece
Treaties of Guyana
Treaties of the Hungarian People's Republic
Treaties of India
Treaties of Iran
Treaties of Ba'athist Iraq
Treaties of Ireland
Treaties of Israel
Treaties of Italy
Treaties of Japan
Treaties of Jordan
Treaties of Kenya
Treaties of South Korea
Treaties of Kyrgyzstan
Treaties of Latvia
Treaties of Lebanon
Treaties of Lithuania
Treaties of Luxembourg
Treaties of Mexico
Treaties of Moldova
Treaties of Montenegro
Treaties of the Netherlands
Treaties of Nicaragua
Treaties of Niger
Treaties of Norway
Treaties of the Polish People's Republic
Treaties of Portugal
Treaties of the Soviet Union
Treaties of Serbia and Montenegro
Treaties of Yugoslavia
Treaties of San Marino
Treaties of Slovakia
Treaties of Slovenia
Treaties of North Macedonia
Treaties of Spain
Treaties of Switzerland
Treaties of Sweden
Treaties of Tajikistan
Treaties of Tanzania
Treaties of Tunisia
Treaties of Turkey
Treaties of the Ukrainian Soviet Socialist Republic
Treaties of the United Kingdom
Treaties of Venezuela
Treaties extended to Aruba
Treaties extended to Gibraltar
Treaties extended to Norfolk Island
Treaties extended to British Hong Kong
1975 in labor relations